The Philippine House Committee on Energy, or House Energy Committee is a standing committee of the Philippine House of Representatives.

Jurisdiction 
As prescribed by House Rules, the committee's jurisdiction includes the following:
 Entities involved in energy or power generation, transmission, distribution and supply
 Exploration, development, utilization or conservation of energy resources

Members, 18th Congress

Historical members

18th Congress

Chairperson 
 Lord Allan Velasco (Marinduque–Lone, PDP–Laban) July 22, 2019 – October 12, 2020

See also 
 House of Representatives of the Philippines
 List of Philippine House of Representatives committees
 Department of Energy
 Energy in the Philippines

References

External links 
House of Representatives of the Philippines

Energy
Energy in the Philippines